Miguel Ángel Paniagua Rivarola (born 14 May 1987) is a Paraguayan football player who plays as a defensive midfielder for Cusco in Peru.

Club career
Paniagua started playing professionally for Guaraní in the Primera División de Paraguay (Paraguayan First Division) in 2006. He became a regular starter for his club during the 2007 season and became the team's captain in the 2009 championship. Playing in the Copa Libertadores 2009 he scored a great goal against Boca Juniors in the Bombonera stadium. Also he scored a spectacular overhead bicycle kick against Libertad in 4-0 crushing victory

He was loaned to Argentine River Plate for the 2009–10 season. After failing the earn a regular place in the River Plate team Paniagua decided to return to his original club, Guarani.

He now plays for Club Olimpia in Paraguay.

References

External links
 
 Miguel Ángel Paniagua – Primera División statistics at Fútbol XXI 
 
 

1987 births
Living people
Paraguayan footballers
Paraguayan expatriate footballers
Sportspeople from Ciudad del Este
C.D. Cuenca footballers
Club Atlético River Plate footballers
Cerro Porteño players
Club Guaraní players
Club Libertad footballers
Club Nacional footballers
Cusco FC footballers
Argentine Primera División players
Ecuadorian Serie A players
Paraguayan Primera División players
Peruvian Primera División players
Association football midfielders
Paraguayan expatriate sportspeople in Ecuador
Paraguayan expatriate sportspeople in Argentina
Paraguayan expatriate sportspeople in Peru
Expatriate footballers in Ecuador
Expatriate footballers in Argentina
Expatriate footballers in Peru